Waakya is a 2017 Indian Marathi-language film. The story focuses on a tribal area in need of education, and was written and directed by Deepak Kadam. It stars Master Panshul Kamod and Priyanka Dnyanlaxmi as the eponymous leads. The film Waakya was chosen out of 280 Films from 35 countries for screening at the  Mumbai International Film Festival. The film is expected to be released theatrically .

References

2014 films
2010s Marathi-language films